The 2019 Charlotte Independence season was the club's fifth season of existence, and their fifth in the USL Championship, the second tier of American soccer.

Background

Club

Current roster
As of June 20, 2019

Competitions

Friendlies 
All times in regular season on Eastern Daylight Time (UTC-04:00)

USL Championship

Standings

Results summary

Matches 

The 2019 USL Championship season schedule for the club was announced on December 19, 2018.
All times in regular season on Eastern Daylight Time (UTC-04:00)

U.S. Open Cup

As a member of the USL Championship, the Independence entered the tournament in the Second Round, played May 14–15, 2019

References

Charlotte Independence seasons
Charlotte
Charlotte Independence
Charlotte